Johann Dietrich Kuhlmann (ca. 1775 – 1846) was a German organ builder.

Life and career 
Kuhlmann became acquainted with the family business of Johann Stephan Heeren as an employee. Together with him, he created the organ in Adelebsen around 1800. After the death of Heeren's son-in-law Johann Friedrich Euler in 1795, Kuhlmann married Heeren's daughter Anna Elisabeth. Heeren's son Johann Christoph worked in the workshop during the last years of his father's life and took over the workshop together with Kuhlmann in 1804. As a result, the company now called itself "Heeren et Kuhlmann". When Heeren's grandson Balthasar Conrad Euler joined the business around 1815, it was renamed "Euler and Kuhlmann". His son Georg Carl Kuhlmann also became an organ builder and can be traced in Westphalia with several new organ buildings. The family business was moved to Hofgeismar in 1910 and continued well into the 20th century. It is considered the oldest organ building company in Germany.

Work

References

Further reading 
 
 
 
 

 

German pipe organ builders
Date of birth missing
1846 deaths
Place of birth missing
People from Göttingen (district)